Chandrapur Airport  is located at Morwa, 9 km north-west of Chandrapur, Maharashtra, India. The airstrip was constructed in 1967 by the Public Works Department and is spread over 22 hectares. Neither navigational aids nor night landing facilities are available on the airstrip.

Development
The state run Maharashtra Airport Development Company (MADC) that operates the airport has no plans to expand the current facility citing obstructions close to the airport. The chimneys of the thermal power plant to its west and overhead power lines all around the field restrict the scope of expansion of this airport. However, the government has plans of developing a greenfield airport at another appropriate site.

References

Airports in Maharashtra
Vidarbha
Airports established in 1967
1967 establishments in Maharashtra
20th-century architecture in India